Skip or Skips may refer to:

Acronyms 
 SKIP (Skeletal muscle and kidney enriched inositol phosphatase), a human gene
 Simple Key-Management for Internet Protocol
 SKIP of New York (Sick Kids need Involved People), a non-profit agency aiding families with sick or developmentally disabled children
 System of Kanji Indexing by Patterns, an original system for indexing kanji by the Kodansha Kanji Learner's Dictionary

Business
 Skip (company), scooter sharing service
 Skip Ltd., a Japanese video game developer
 SkipTheDishes, food delivery company

Characters
 Skip Ricter, a character in the movie Cars
 the title character of the autobiography My Dog Skip by Willie Morris and the film adaptation of the same name
 Skip, a minor character from the TV series Angel
 Skip, a character from the British children's show Bob the Builder
 Skips, a character on the American animated series Regular Show
 Skips, on Camp Lazlo, an American animated TV series

People 
 Skip (nickname)
 Ring name of Chris Candido (1972-2005), American professional wrestler

Storms
 Tropical Storm Skip (1982)
 Tropical Storm Skip (1985)

Other uses
 Minecart, also called a skip
 Skip (container), British English word for large waste container, similar to US dumpster
 Skip (curling), the captain of a curling team
 Skip (radio), skywave radio propagation
 Skips (snack)
 Skip, a detergent brand from Unilever
 The Skip, a route run by the Regional Transportation District that runs between North and South Boulder, Colorado

See also
 Skep, a type of beehive
 Skip-stop, a public transit service pattern
 Skipper (disambiguation)
 Skipping (disambiguation)
 Skippy (disambiguation)
 Skiptrace, a person being searched for; derived from the idiomatic expression "to skip town"